Eikenberry Bridge, also known as Bridge 1-19, Lost Bridge, and Miami County Bridge #28, is a historic Pratt Through Truss bridge located in Richland Township, Miami County, Indiana.  It was built about 1920 by the Rochester Bridge Company and spans the Eel River.  It is a two-span metal truss bridge with an overall length of 227 feet.

It was listed on the National Register of Historic Places in 2006.

References

Truss bridges in the United States
Road bridges on the National Register of Historic Places in Indiana
Bridges completed in 1920
Transportation buildings and structures in Miami County, Indiana
National Register of Historic Places in Miami County, Indiana
Metal bridges in the United States